Waldamar Joseph "Walter" Rooney (February 13, 1888 – April 9, 1965) was a professional ice hockey centre for the Quebec Bulldogs. He helped Quebec win the Stanley Cup in 1912. In 1913, Rooney was dressed for Quebec as a spare, but did not play any games. However, he was featured on the Stanley Cup winning picture with the rest of the Bulldogs team.

References

1888 births
1965 deaths
Anglophone Quebec people
Canadian ice hockey centres
Ice hockey people from Quebec City
Quebec Bulldogs (NHA) players
Stanley Cup champions